Nawaz Haq (born 10 September 1981) Is a Pakistani track and field athlete. He won a silver medal in the 400 metre hurdles event of the 11th South Asian Federation (SAF) Games in Dhaka in February 2010. He represented his country in that event at the 2007 World Championships in Athletics.

References 

Living people
1981 births
Pakistani male hurdlers
World Athletics Championships athletes for Pakistan
South Asian Games silver medalists for Pakistan
South Asian Games medalists in athletics
21st-century Pakistani people